Sandbars in Hong Kong:
Ap Lei Chau - Ap Lei Pai, Hong Kong
Cheung Chau, Hong Kong
Lung Kwu Chau, Hong Kong
Pui O, Hong Kong
Sha Chau, Hong Kong
Shek O Headland - Tai Tau Chau, Hong Kong
Yim Tin Tsai - Ma Shi Chau, Hong Kong

See also

Geography of Hong Kong
Islands and peninsulas in Hong Kong
Sandbar
Isthmus

Landforms of Hong Kong
Shoals of Asia
Pearl River Delta
Sandbars